The Calapooya Mountains are a mountain range in Lane and Douglas counties of southwestern Oregon in the United States.

Geology 

The Calapooya Mountains are composed of volcanic rocks and newer sedimentary strata.  The mountains have been deeply eroded by the Coast Fork Willamette River and its tributaries.  In the southern drainage, the tributaries of the North Umpqua River have cut into the southern slopes. The soil is silty, clay loam formed from sandstone, sediment, and igneous rocks.

Topography 

The Calapooya Mountains and the Calapooya Divide are two parts of a spur of the Western Cascade mountains in the U.S. state of Oregon that form the divide between the watersheds of the Willamette and Umpqua rivers. At its southeastern end, the spur joins the Cascade Range near Cowhorn Mountain near the headwaters of the Middle Fork Willamette River and the North Umpqua River. A topographic map in the Atlas of Oregon shows the Calapooya Mountains curving northwest from near Potter, McGowan, and Balm mountains past Bohemia Mountain to Holland Point, south of Oakridge. From near Bohemia Mountain, a block of mountains connected to the Calapooya Mountains runs due west along the border between Lane and Douglas counties to the vicinity of Interstate 5 (I-5) near Rice Hill. This block is known as the Calapooya Divide.

Streams flowing south from the Calapooyas into the North Umpqua River include Steamboat, Canton, and Rock creeks, while Calapooya Creek flows west from the divide into the Umpqua main stem. Streams flowing north or east into the Middle Fork Willamette River include Tumblebug, Staley, Coal, and Packard creeks. Flowing northwest or west into the Coast Fork Willamette River or its major tributary, the Row River, are Brice, Layng, and Mosby creeks and Big River. The Umpqua flows west through the Oregon Coast Range to the Pacific Ocean at Reedsport, while the Willamette flows north to the Columbia River, which flows northwest to the Pacific Ocean at Astoria.

Climate 

The climate in the Calapooya Mountains follows a pattern of wet winters and dry summers. Above , a significant part of this falls as snow.

History 

Throughout the history of the region, the range has provided a geographic and cultural barrier between the Willamette Valley and the South Umpqua Valley, effectively separating Western Oregon from Southern Oregon. In the 19th century, it separated the tribal domains of the Kalapuya and Umpqua tribes of Native Americans. During the 1840s, the mountains proved a barrier to white settlers seeking to move into southern Oregon or to move southward to the California gold fields. The Applegate Trail, blazed in the late 1840s, provided the first reliable path for white settlement through the western end of the mountains.  Interstate 5 essentially follows the route of the trail between Eugene and Roseburg.

The mountains have been an important timber source in the 20th century. The eastern end of the mountains are largely within the Umpqua National Forest in the south and Willamette National Forest in the north.

References

Works cited
Loy, William G., et al. (2001). Atlas of Oregon. Eugene, Oregon: University of Oregon Press. .

Mountain ranges of Oregon
Landforms of Lane County, Oregon
Landforms of Douglas County, Oregon
Willamette National Forest
Umpqua National Forest